Narahara may refer to:

Narahara (surname), a Japanese surname
Mount Narahara, a mountain of Okinawa Prefecture, Japan
Narahara Station, a railway station in Mimasaka, Okayama Prefecture, Japan
15716 Narahara, a main-belt asteroid